The men's lightweight double sculls rowing event at the 2011 Pan American Games will be held from October 15–18 at the Canoe & Rowing Course in Ciudad Guzman. The defending Pan American Games champion is Horacio Sicilia & Maximiliano Martínez of Argentina.

Schedule
All times are Central Standard Time (UTC-6).

Results

Heats

Heat 1

Heat 2

Repechages

Repechage 1

Repechage 2

Final B

Final A

References

Rowing at the 2011 Pan American Games